Spare Change is an action game designed by Dan and Mike Zeller and published in 1983 by Broderbund for the Apple II and Atari 8-bit home computers. A Commodore 64 version was written by Steven Ohmert and released the same year. Ports for FM-7 and Sharp X1 were released in 1985. The difficulty of Spare Change can be customized through seven settings at the "Zerks Control Panel".

Plot
Spare Change is a game in which arcade characters called Zerks escape their game and steal tokens from the Spare Change Arcade. The player as the arcade owner must keep the Zerks from collecting enough to retire.

Gameplay
The player is competing with the Zerks to collect tokens. If the Zerks get five tokens stored in their piggy bank, then they win and the game ends. If the player fills the two token bins with a total of ten tokens, then the level advances. The Zerks can be distracted by the jukebox, popcorn machine, and pay phone—each of which is operated with tokens. Activating the jukebox causes the Zerks to dance. The player also needs to keep the arcade operating by refilling the token machines and cash register. When ten tokens are collected, the Zerk Show booth is unlocked, which allows the opportunity to steal tokens from the Zerks.

Reception
David Stone reviewed the game for Computer Gaming World, and stated that "In sum, SCA is an exceptionally good game because it has increasing levels of difficulty, strategy is required to outwit the Zerks, and you are given rewards (the cartoons) for mastering each level." Keith Valenza called it "zany fun" in the August 1984 issue of Antic. He criticized the lack of visual detail in the Zerks and the slow progression of game difficulty, but liked the tuning afforded by the Zerks Control Panel.

Reviews
Electronic Fun with Computers & Games - Mar, 1984

References

External links
Review in Ahoy!
Review in Creative Computing
Review in Softalk
Review in Softline
1984 Software Encyclopedia from Electronic Games
Review in Compute!'s Gazette
Review in GAMES magazine
Review in Electronic Games
Article in Electronic Games
Review in Electronic Games

1983 video games
Alien invasions in video games
Apple II games
Atari 8-bit family games
Broderbund games
Commodore 64 games
FM-7 games
Sharp X1 games
Video games about video games
Video games developed in the United States